Ysgol Glanwydden is a Welsh Primary school in Glanwydden, near Llandudno, for 3-11 year olds. The school celebrated its hundred-year anniversary in 2010, with the building being completed in 1910 and opening to students in spring 1911.  In October 2010 the school had 274 pupils.

Details
Glanwydden is a primary school, which has 301 pupils (2011). It caters to pupils up to year 6. It is located between Penrhyn Bay and Glanwydden on the north wales coast . The school has 11 classes, 5 are in the infants and 6 in the juniors.

References 

Primary schools in Conwy County Borough
Educational institutions established in 1911
1911 establishments in Wales
School buildings completed in 1910